Endophilin-A1 is a protein that in humans is encoded by the SH3GL2 gene.

Interactions
SH3GL2 has been shown to interact with DNM1, Amphiphysin, ADAM9, SH3KBP1 and ADAM15.

References

Further reading